Ruby is an unincorporated community in Rapides Parish, Louisiana, United States. Ruby had a post office from April 18, 1900, until October 8, 2011; it still has its own ZIP code, 71365. The elevation of Ruby is 98 feet. Rapides Parish is in the Central Time Zone (UTC -6 hours).

References

Unincorporated communities in Rapides Parish, Louisiana
Unincorporated communities in Louisiana